Trimbak Rao Dabhade (? – 28 April 1731) was a Senapati of Maratha empire during 1729–1731. He was the son of Khande Rao Dabhade and Umabai Dabhade.

The Dabhade clan had carried out several raids in the rich province of Gujarat, collecting chauth and sardeshmukhi taxes. After the death of his father Khande Rao in 1729, Trimbak Rao became the senapati. When the Maratha king Shahu I's Peshwa (prime minister) Bajirao I decided to take over the tax collection in Gujarat, the Dabhades rebelled against the king. Trimbak Rao was assisted by Nizam of Hyderabad and other Maratha clans that had traditionally controlled Gujarat (Gaekwad and Kadam Bande). On 1 April 1731, he was defeated and killed by Bajirao in the Battle of Dabhoi. Even after killing him, Shahu and Bajirao avoided a rivalry with the powerful Dabhade clan: Trimbak's brother Yashwant Rao was made the new senapati of Shahu. The Dabhade family was allowed to continue collecting chauth from Gujarat on the condition that they would deposit half the collections in the Shahu's treasury.

References

External links
Full text of "The First Nizam"

1731 deaths
Marathi people
Year of birth unknown
People from Talegaon